Mohammed Abbas Al-Balochi (born 30 September 2002), is an Emirati professional footballer who plays as a midfielder for UAE Pro League side Al Ain.

Club career

Al Ain
His official debut with the first-team was against Al Wahda on 12 March 2021 in League. He scored his first senior goal on 21 March 2021 against Ajman.

2020–21 season

International career
In 2021, Abbas was called up for the first time to join the United Arab Emirates national team for the Iran and Iraq matches in 2022 FIFA World Cup qualification. He made his international debut on 29 March 2022, against South Korea in a 2022 FIFA World Cup qualification.

Career statistics

Club

Notes

References

External links
 
 

2002 births
Living people
Emirati footballers
Emirati people of Baloch descent
Association football midfielders
UAE Pro League players
Al Ain FC players